Post-communism is the period of political and economic transformation or transition in former communist states located in Eastern Europe and parts of Africa and Asia in which new governments aimed to create free market-oriented capitalist economies.  In 1989–1992, communist party governance collapsed in most communist party-governed states. After severe hardships the communist parties retained control in China, Cuba, Laos, North Korea, and Vietnam. Yugoslavia fell into parts that plunged into a long complex series of wars between ethnic groups. Soviet-oriented communist movements collapsed in countries where it was not in control.

Politics 
The policies of most Communist parties in both the Eastern and Western Bloc had been governed by the example of the Soviet Union. In most countries in the Eastern Bloc following the Revolutions of 1989 and the fall of communist-led governments, the communist parties split in two factions: a reformist social democratic party and a new less reformist-oriented communist party. The newly created social democratic parties were generally larger and more powerful than the remaining communist parties—only in Belarus, Kazakhstan, Moldova, Russia, and Tajikistan the communist parties remained a significant force.

In the Western Bloc, many of the self-styled communist parties reacted by changing their policies to a more moderate and less radical course. In countries such as Italy and reunited Germany, post-communism is marked by the increased influence of their existing social democrats. The anti-Soviet communist parties in the Western Bloc (e.g. the Trotskyist parties) who felt that the dissolution of the Soviet Union vindicated their views and predictions did not particularly prosper from it—in fact, some became less radical as well.

Economy 
Several communist states had undergone economic reforms from a planned economy towards a more market-oriented economy in the 1980s, notably Hungary, Poland, Bulgaria and Yugoslavia. The post-communist economic transition was much more abrupt and aimed at creating fully capitalist economies.

All the countries concerned have abandoned the traditional tools of communist economic control and moved more or less successfully toward free-market systems. Although some, such as Charles Paul Lewis, stress the beneficial effect of multinational investment, the reforms also had important negative consequences that are still unfolding. Average standards of living registered a catastrophic fall in the early 1990s in many parts of the former Comecon—most notably in the former Soviet Union—and began to rise again only toward the end of the decade. Some populations are still considerably worse off today than they were in 1989 (e.g. Moldova, and Serbia). Others have bounced back considerably beyond that threshold (e.g. the Czech Republic, Hungary, and Poland) and some such as Estonia, Latvia, Lithuania (Baltic Tiger), and Slovakia underwent an economic boom, although all have suffered from the 2009 recession, except for Poland, which was one of two countries (the other was Albania) in Europe maintained growth despite the worldwide recession.

Armenia's economy, like that of other former states of Soviet Union, suffered from the consequences of a centrally-planned economy and the collapse of former Soviet trade patterns. Another important aspect for difficulty of standing up after the collapse is that the investment and funding that was coming to Armenian industry from Soviet Union has been gone, leaving only a few large enterprises in operation. Furthermore, the aftereffects of the 1988 Armenian earthquake were still being felt. Despite the fact that a cease-fire has been in place since 1994, the dispute with Azerbaijan over Nagorno-Karabakh has not been resolved. Since Armenia was heavily dependent on outside supplies of energy and most raw materials at that time, the resulting closure of both the Azerbaijani and Turkish borders has devastated the economy. During 1992–1993, the GDP had dropped around 60% from its peak in 1989. Few years after adoption of national currency, the dram in 1993, it experienced hyperinflation.

As of 2021, most post-communist countries in Europe are generally seen to have mixed economies, although some such as Estonia, Romania, and Slovakia often adopt more traditionally free-market policies, such as flat tax rates, than does the Western Bloc. A fundamental challenge in post-communist economies is that institutional pressures that reflect the logic of capitalism and democracy are exerted on organizations, including businessfirms and government agencies, that were created under communism and to this day are run by managers socialized in that context, resulting in a great deal of continuing tension in organizations in post-communist states.

See also 
 Chinese economic reform
 Communist nostalgia
 Dissolution of the Soviet Union
 Eurocommunism
 Fall of communism in Albania
 History of communism#Contemporary communism (1993–present)
 List of communist parties with national parliamentary representation
 Postsocialism
 Predictions of the collapse of the Soviet Union
 Revolutions of 1989
 World communism

References

Further reading
 Bown, Archie. The Rise and Fall of Communism (2009)
 Fürst, Juliane, Silvio Pons and Mark Selden, eds. The Cambridge History of Communism (Volume 3): Endgames?.Late Communism in Global Perspective, 1968 to the Present  (2017)  excerpt
 Kotkin, Stephen. Armageddon Averted: The Soviet Collapse, 1970-2000 (2nd ed. 2008) excerpt
 Pons, Silvio, and Robert Service, eds. A Dictionary of 20th-Century Communism (2010).
 Priestland,  David. The Red Flag: A History of Communism (Grove, 2009).
 Service, Robert. Comrades: A World History of Communism (2007).

External links 
 "Parties and Elections in Europe"
 Daniel Nelson (July/August 2000). "Dangerous Assumptions" in the Bulletin of the Atomic Scientists.
 "Transitions Online". News coverage of post-communist Europe and Central Asia
 "Communism: A Love Affair?: Russians Nostalgic for Soviet Social Services" by The Global Post.
 Gerald M. Easter (2012). "Capital, Coercion, and Post-Communist States". Cornell University Press. .

Marxism–Leninism
Decommunization
Eastern Bloc